Marina Teresa Squerciati is an American actress. She currently appears as a regular in Chicago P.D. as Officer Kim Burgess.

Early life
Marina Squerciati was born in New York City and she is of Italian heritage. She is the daughter of academic and writer Marie Squerciati. She graduated from Northwestern University with a B.A. in theater in 2003.

Career

Theater work
Squerciati made her Broadway debut in an adaptation of Ernst Lubitsch's To Be or Not to Be, directed by Tony Award winner Casey Nicholaw. Off-Broadway, she starred in Manipulation, Beauty of the Father and others. Squerciati created the role of "Kerri Taylor" in the a cappella musical comedy Perfect Harmony, and was a member of The Essentials.

Film and television
In 1993, Squerciati appeared in The Nutcracker, directed by Emile Ardolino. She made her feature film debut in It's Complicated in 2009. In 2012, she appeared in the films Alter Egos and Frances Ha. She also starred in the indie film Sparks based on the comic SPARKS by William Katt.

Her television debut was on Law & Order: Criminal Intent in 2009. After appearing in guest roles on The Good Wife, Damages, Blue Bloods and Law & Order: Special Victims Unit in 2010 and 2011, she gained attention in the fall of 2011 in an 8-episode arc on the fifth season of Gossip Girl. In 2013, she guest starred on the FX series The Americans as a Soviet spy.

In August 2013, it was announced that Squerciati had been cast as Officer Kim Burgess in the Chicago Fire spin-off Chicago P.D.. The show premiered on January 8, 2014. The seventh season premiered on September 25, 2019 and on February 27, 2020, NBC announced that the show was being renewed for an 8th, 9th and 10th season.

Personal life
Squerciati is married to Eli Kay-Oliphant, an attorney.

On February 15, 2017, Squerciati announced her pregnancy via Twitter; she gave birth to a daughter in May.

In September 2019, court documents alleged that Squerciati was the child of the late financier John R. Jakobson (who was also the father of actress Maggie Wheeler), and that while she was allegedly promised to be named in the mogul’s will, no provision was made for her. Supporting documents suggest that Jakobson paid for Squerciati's nanny, child support, and Squerciati's tuition at Dalton and Northwestern University.

Filmography

Film

Television

References

External links
 
 
 

20th-century American actresses
21st-century American actresses
Actresses from Chicago
Actresses from New York City
American film actresses
American stage actresses
American television actresses
Living people
Northwestern University alumni
Year of birth missing (living people)
American people of Italian descent